Textor is a surname of German and Dutch origin, meaning "weaver". Notable people with the surname include:

Benoit Textor (c. 1509–c. 1565), French physician and naturalist
Clinton Textor (1856-1943), American politician and jurist
George Textor (1886-1954), American Major League Baseball catcher
John Textor (born 1965), American businessman

See also
Texter (surname)